Fotis Kosmas  GR: "Φὼτιος Κοσμάς" (26 November 1926 – 15 June 1995) was a Greek hurdler and decathlete who competed in the 1952 Summer Olympics.

Biography
Kosmas was born in the village of Clio, on the island of Lesvos. His father, Christos, was a refugee from Aivalik of Asia Minor, and his mother Despina was from the main town of the island, Mytilini.  After his parents wed, they stayed in Lesvos.  They moved from Lesvos to Alexandroupoli before World War II, and during the war the whole family moved to the island of Samotrace.  There the young Fotis met his wife Meropi, with whom he married when they returned to Alexandroupoli.  The couple had two children, Despina and Christo.

References

1926 births
1995 deaths
Greek decathletes
Greek male hurdlers
Olympic athletes of Greece
Athletes (track and field) at the 1952 Summer Olympics
Mediterranean Games gold medalists for Greece
Mediterranean Games medalists in athletics
Athletes (track and field) at the 1951 Mediterranean Games
Sportspeople from Alexandroupolis
20th-century Greek people